The Marvin L. Manheim Award For Significant Contributions in the Field of Workflow is an industry recognition created by the Workflow Management Coalition in honor of the late Marvin L. Manheim. Manheim was a co-founder of the Workflow Management Coalition and was the William A. Patterson Distinguished Professor of Transportation at the Kellogg Graduate School of Management at Northwestern University from 1983 until his death in August 2000.

Career
Before joining the Kellogg School, he held faculty positions at the Massachusetts Institute of Technology. Prof. Manheim's major area of interest was information technology and its uses strategically, competitively, and organizationally. It included strategy formulation and implementation processes; the management of globally competing organizations; and international transportation and logistics. He was also interested in computer assistance to human problem-solving and decision-making, including decision support systems (DSS) and artificial intelligence.

Award
The workflow award is given annually, since 2002, to recognize an individual or a specific group for their "influence, contribution, or distinguished use of workflow systems." The criteria for consideration is based on any significant contribution and not limited to members of the coalition. Both software developers and software end users have finalists and award recipients.

Manheim was a founder of Cambridge Systematics, who in 2001 established a separate awards program called the "Marvin L. Manheim Award" to honor his memory and promote innovation in the field of transportation. This is a separate program and not related to the workflow award.

Recipients 

2017: Derek Miers, United Kingdom
2016: Sandy Kemsley, Canada
2015: Jim Sinur, United States
2014: Connie W Moore, United States
2006: David Hollingsworth, United Kingdom	
2005: Robert Shapiro, United States
2003: Keith Swenson, United States
2002: Jon Pyke, United Kingdom
2001: Haruo Hayami, Japan

References 

Workflow technology
Business and industry awards